Calappa is a genus of crabs known commonly as box crabs or shame-faced crabs. The name box crab comes from their distinctly bulky carapace, and the name shame-faced is from anthropomorphising the way the crab's chelae (claws) fold up and cover its face, as if it were hiding its face in shame.

Species
There are 43 extant species in the genus:

Calappa acutispina Lai, Chan & Ng, 2006
Calappa africana Lai & Ng, 2006
Calappa bicornis Miers, 1884
Calappa bilineata Ng, Lai & Aungtonya, 2002
Calappa calappa (Linnaeus, 1758)
Calappa capellonis Laurie, 1906
Calappa cinerea Holthuis, 1958
Calappa clypeata Borradaile, 1903
Calappa conifera Galil, 1997
Calappa convexa Saussure, 1853
Calappa dumortieri Guinot, 1962
Calappa exanthematosa Alcock & Anderson, 1894
Calappa flammea (Herbst, 1794)
Calappa galloides Stimpson, 1859
Calappa gallus (Herbst, 1803)
Calappa granulata (Linnaeus, 1758)
Calappa guerini De Brito Capello, 1871
Calappa hepatica (Linnaeus, 1758)
Calappa japonica Ortmann, 1892
Calappa karenae Ng & Lai, 2012
Calappa liaoi Ng, 2002
Calappa lophos (Herbst, 1782)
Calappa monilicanthus Latreille, 1812
Calappa nitida Galil, 1997
Calappa ocellata Holthuis, 1958
Calappa ocularia Holthuis, 1958
Calappa pelii Herklots, 1851
Calappa philargius (Linnaeus, 1758)
Calappa pokipoki Ng, 2000
Calappa pustulosa Alcock, 1896
Calappa quadrimaculata Takeda & Shikatani, 1990
Calappa rosea Jarocki, 1825
Calappa rubroguttata Herklots, 1851
Calappa sebastieni Galil, 1997
Calappa springeri Rathbun, 1931
Calappa sulcata Rathbun, 1898
Calappa tortugae Rathbun, 1933
Calappa torulosa Galil, 1997
Calappa tuberculata (Fabricius, 1793)
Calappa tuerkayana Pastore, 1995
Calappa undulata Dai & Yang, 1991
Calappa woodmasoni Alcock, 1896
Calappa yamasitae Sakai, 1980

Extinct species
A further 18 species are known only from fossils.

Calappa chungii  Hu and Tao 1985
Calappa costaricana  Rathbun 1918
Calappa earlei  Withers 1924
Calappa heberti  Brocchi 1883
Calappa lanensis  Rathbun 1926
Calappa laraensis  Van Straelen 1933
Calappa madoerensis  Van Straelen 1938
Calappa oboui  Hu and Tao 1996
Calappa pavimenta  Schweitzer et al. 2006
Calappa praelata  Lorenthey 1929
Calappa protopustulosa  Noetling 1901
Calappa restricta  Milne-Edwards 1873
Calappa robertsi  Ross 1964
Calappa sahelensis  Van Straelen 1936
Calappa sangiranensis  Van Straelen 1938
Calappa sexapinosa  Morris and Collins 1991
Calappa zinsmeisteri  Feldmann and Wilson 1988
Calappa zurcheri  Bouvier 1899

Fossils of within this genus can be found in sediment of Europe, United States, Mexico, Central America, Australia and Japan from Paleogene to recent (age range: 33.9 to 0.0 Ma).

References

External links

Calappoidea
Paleogene first appearances